Rice bran oil is the oil extracted from the hard outer brown layer of rice called bran. It is popular as a cooking oil in East Asia, the Indian subcontinent, and Southeast Asia including India, Nepal, Bangladesh, Indonesia, Japan, Southern China and Malaysia.

Composition and properties
Rice bran oil has a composition similar to that of peanut oil, with 38% monounsaturated, 37% polyunsaturated, and 25% saturated fatty acids. 

A component of rice bran oil is the γ-oryzanol, at around 2% of crude oil content. Thought to be a single compound when initially isolated, γ-oryzanol is now known to be a mixture of steryl and other triterpenyl esters of ferulic acids. Also present are tocopherols and tocotrienols (two types of vitamin E) and phytosterols.

Fatty acid composition

Physical properties of crude and refined rice bran oil

Research

Rice bran oil consumption has been found to significantly decrease total cholesterol (TC), LDL-C and triglyceride (TG) levels.

Uses 
Rice bran oil is an edible oil which is used in various forms of food preparation. It is also the basis of some vegetable ghee. Rice bran wax, obtained from rice bran oil, is used as a substitute for carnauba wax in cosmetics, confectionery, shoe creams, and polishing compounds.

Isolated γ-oryzanol from rice bran oil is available in China as an over-the-counter drug, and in other countries as a dietary supplement. There is no meaningful evidence supporting its efficacy for treating any medical condition.

Comparison to other vegetable oils

See also 
 Cereal germ
 Bran
 Rice germ oil
 Wheat germ oil
 Wheat bran oil
 Yushō disease

References 

Cooking oils
East Asian condiments
Indonesian condiments
Rice products
South Asian cuisine
Vegetable oils